These are the complete Grand Prix racing results for Benetton Formula.

Complete Formula One results
(key)

Notes
† – The driver did not finish the Grand Prix, but was classified, as he completed over 90% of the race distance.
‡ – Half points awarded as less than 75% of the race distance was completed.

References

Formula One constructor results
results